Duke of Cardona is a hereditary title in the Peerage of Spain, accompanied by the dignity of Grandee and granted in 1482 by Ferdinand II to Juan Ramón Folch de Cardona, 5th Count of Cardona, as an elevation to dukedom. It was originally granted as "Viscount of Cardona" and later elevated to "Count of Cardona", as a noble title in the 15th century to members of the Catalan family known as "Folch de Cardona".

Dukes of Cardona

See also
List of dukes in the peerage of Spain
List of current Grandees of Spain

References

Dukedoms of Spain
 
Lists of dukes